Lindi Airport  is an airport serving Lindi, the capital of the Lindi Region of Tanzania. It is also known as Kikwetu Airport.

Location
The coordinates of Lindi Airport (Kikwetu Airport) are: 09°51'01.0"S, 39°45'41.0"E (Latitude:-9.850282; Longitude:39.761381).

Overview
Lindi Airport is owned by the Government of Tanzania and is administered by the Tanzania Civil Aviation Authority. In September 2016, the government of Tanzania announced plans to expand and upgrade the airport at an estimated cost of US$125 million. The government is actively seeking funding for this purpose.

See also

 List of airports in Tanzania
 Transport in Tanzania

References

External links
OpenStreetMap - Lindi
OurAirports - Kikwetu

Kikwetu Airport at World Airport Codes

Airports in Tanzania
Lindi Region
Transport in Tanzania
Buildings and structures in the Lindi Region